Janet Burke (born 11 November 1962) is a Jamaican sprinter. She competed in the women's 200 metres at the 1984 Summer Olympics.

References

External links
 

1962 births
Living people
Athletes (track and field) at the 1984 Summer Olympics
Jamaican female sprinters
Olympic athletes of Jamaica
Place of birth missing (living people)
Olympic female sprinters